Ciabattoni is an Italian surname. Notable people with the surname include:

Agata Ciabattoni, Italian mathematician
Alex Ciabattoni (born 1994), Australian basketball player
Tara Ciabattoni, actress in 2011 comedy film The Love Patient

Italian-language surnames